was a town located in Yamamoto District, Akita Prefecture, Japan.

As of 2003, the town has an estimated population of 7,145 and a density of 184.82 persons per km². The total area is 38.66 km².

On March 20, 2006, Hachiryū, along with the towns of Koto'oka and Yamamoto (all from Yamamoto District), was merged to create the town of Mitane.

External links
 Mitane official website 

Dissolved municipalities of Akita Prefecture
Mitane, Akita